Capítulo III: Ahogando Penas (English: Chapter III: Drowning Sorrows) is the third studio album by Mexican-American recording artist DJ Kane. It was released on March 20, 2007 by EMI Latin.

Track listing

References

2007 albums
DJ Kane albums
EMI Latin albums
Spanish-language albums